Southeast Asian cinema is the film industry and films produced in, or by natives of Southeast Asia. It includes any films produced in Brunei, Cambodia, East Timor, Indonesia, Laos, Malaysia, Myanmar, the Philippines, Singapore, Thailand and Vietnam. The majority of the films made in this region came from the Philippines, Thailand, and Indonesia where its filmmaking industries in these countries are already well-established with film directors such as Lino Brocka, Apichatpong Weerasethakul, and Joko Anwar are well-known outside of the region. Notable production studios in Southeast Asia include Star Cinema, TBA Studios and Reality Entertainment in the Philippines, GDH 559 and Sahamongkol Film International in Thailand, Rapi Films in Indonesia and Studio 68 in Vietnam 

Southeast Asian cinema is a sub-section of continental Asian cinema, which in turn comes under the umbrella term of World cinema, a term used in some anglophone countries to describe any foreign language films.

Key figures

Cambodia

Davy Chou - Contemporary Cambodian director (Diamond Island, Return to Seoul)
Kavich Neang - Contemporary Cambodian director (White Building)
Haing S. Ngor – Academy Award-winning Cambodian-American actor (The Killing Fields)
Rithy Panh – French-schooled  filmmaker.
Tim Pek -Australian film producer.
Tea Lum Kun –  Director of the highly acclaimed film The King Snake's Wife.

Indonesia

 Usmar Ismail –  One of Pioneer of Indonesian Films (After The Curfew)
 Teguh Karya – Director (Badai Pasti Berlalu, Ibunda)
Bing Slamet – Veteran actor (Bing Slamet Koboi Cengeng).
Benyamin Sueb – Veteran actor (Benyamin Biang Kerok).
Christine Hakim – Veteran actress (Whispering Sands, Tjoet Nja Dien).
Dono, Kasino, Indro – Veteran comedian group (Maju Kena Mundur Kena).
Dian Sastrowardoyo – Popular actress (Whispering Sands).
Garin Nugroho – Director (Opera Jawa).
Sjumandjaja – Director (Si Doel Anak Modern).
Aria Dewa – Director (Identitas).
Riri Riza – Director (Petualangan Sherina, Gie, Laskar Pelangi).
Joko Anwar – Director (Forbidden Door, Dead Time, A Copy of My Mind, Halfworlds, Satan's Slaves)
Teddy Soeriaatmadja – Director (Lovely Man, Something In The Way)
Iko Uwais – Martial-Arts Actor (Merantau, The Raid : Redemption, The Raid 2 : Berandal)
Kamila Andini - Female director (The Mirror Never Lies, Yuni, Before, Now & Then)
Timo Tjahjanto - Director (V/H/S/2, May the Devil Take You, The Night Comes for Us)

Laos

Som Ock Southiponh – Independent director, producer and screenwriter (Red Lotus).
Mattie Do – Independent Lao-American director and producer (The Long Walk, Dearest Sister, Chanthaly)
Anysay Keola – Independent Lao director and founder of Lao New Wave Cinema (Expiration Date, Noy – Above it All, At the Horizon)

Malaysia

P. Ramlee – Leading man, screenwriter and director
 U-Wei Bin Haji Saari - Director and screenwriter
Abdul Razak Mohaideen – Director
Yasmin Ahmad – Director (Sepet)
Michelle Yeoh - Malaysian-Chinese Academy Award Best Actress (Crazy Rich Asians, Everything Everywhere All at Once)

Myanmar

Min Htin Ko Ko Gyi – Burmese film director and founder of the Human Rights Human Dignity International Film Festival. (Beyond the Dream and The Last Poem)
Kyi Soe Tun – Myanmar's most prominent director. His films include Upstream and Blood.

Philippines

 José Nepomuceno – The Father of the Philippine Cinema
 Rogelio de la Rosa –  Pre-World War II matinee idol
 Brillante Mendoza – Cannes Film Festival Best Director (Kinatay)
 Jaclyn Jose –  Cannes Film Festival Best Actress (Ma' Rosa)
 John Arcilla –  Venice Film Festival Best Actor (On The Job: The Missing 8)
 Lav Diaz –  Venice, Berlinale, and Locarno prize-winning director (The Woman Who Left, A Lullaby to the Sorrowful Mystery, From What Is Before)
 Dolly de Leon - Golden Globe-nominated Actress (Historya ni Ha, Triangle of Sadness)
 Nora Aunor –  Internationally award winning actress (Himala, Thy Womb)
 Lino Brocka –  Internationally acclaimed director (Tinimbang Ka Ngunit Kulang, Maynila: Sa mga Kuko ng Liwanag)
 Erik Matti –  Internationally acclaimed director (On the Job, On the Job: The Missing 8, Seklusyon)
 Eddie Romero –  Awarded National Artist of the Philippines
 Eddie Garcia –  Veteran actor and director
 Fernando Poe Jr. - Veteran actor and director (Ang Panday, Iyo ang Tondo, Kanya ang Cavite, Ang Probinsyano)
 Vilma Santos –  Veteran actress (Anak)
 Jay Ilagan - Veteran actor (Soltero,Sister Stella L.)
 Christopher de Leon - Veteran actor (Hindi Nahahati ang Langit, Cain and Abel)
 Charo Santos-Concio - Veteran actress (Aguila, Kakabakaba Ka Ba?)
 Ishmael Bernal –  Director (Himala)
 Gerardo de Leon –  Director (Banaue)
 Mike de Leon – Director (Kisapmata, Batch '81)
 Marilou Diaz-Abaya –  Director (Moral, José Rizal, Muro-Ami)
 Maryo J. de los Reyes –  Director (Magnifico).
 Jerrold Tarog –  Director (Heneral Luna, Goyo: Ang Batang Heneral)
 Isabel Sandoval –  Filipina-American director (Aparisyon, Lingua Franca)
 Avid Liongoren –  Animator (Saving Sally, Hayop Ka!)
 Chai Fonacier - Actress (Patay na si Hesus, Nocebo)

Singapore

Anthony Chen  – Director and producer (Ilo Ilo, Wet Season)
Boo Junfeng – Director and screenwriter (Sandcastle, Apprentice)
Eric Khoo – Director and producer (Mee Pok Man, 12 Storeys)
Jack Neo – Actor and director (I Not Stupid, Ah Boys to Men)
K. Rajagopal – Director and screenwriter (A Yellow Bird)
Kirsten Tan – Director and screenwriter (Pop Aye)
Royston Tan – Director and producer (15, 881)
Sandi Tan – Critic and director (Shirkers)
Tan Pin Pin – Documentarian (To Singapore, With Love)
He Shuming – Director  and screenwriter (Ajoomma)

Thailand

Apichatpong Weerasethakul – Cannes-prize winning Thai avant garde director (Blissfully Yours, Tropical Malady, Uncle Boonmee Who Can Recall His Past Lives, Memoria).
Chatrichalerm Yukol – Veteran director (The Legend of Suriyothai, King Naresuan).
Nonzee Nimibutr – Director and producer who influenced the Thai industry's pan-Asian directions (Nang Nak, Jan Dara).
The Pang Brothers – Although born in Hong Kong, these twin-brother filmmakers got their start in Thailand and made Bangkok Dangerous in 1999 and The Eye, a pan-Asian co-production in 2002.
Pen-Ek Ratanaruang – "New wave" director (Last Life in the Universe, Invisible Waves).
Wisit Sasanatieng – "New wave" director (Tears of the Black Tiger, Citizen Dog).
Banjong Pisanthanakun – director of several commercially successful horror films, including Shutter, Pee Mak and The Medium.
Nawapol Thamrongrattanarit - independent director of contemporary films such as 36, Mary Is Happy, Mary Is Happy and Happy Old Year.
Petchara Chaowarat – iconic leading lady of Thai films in the 1960s and '70s.
Tony Jaa – Action star (Ong-Bak: Muay Thai Warrior, Tom-Yum-Goong).
Pimchanok Luevisadpaibul – contemporary Thai actress.
Chutimon Chuengcharoensukying – contemporary young Thai actress known for her role in Bad Genius.
Mario Maurer – young actor of Chinese and German lineage, widely known in Asia for his performance in The Love of Siam.
 Sunny Suwanmethanont – contemporary Thai actor of French and Singaporean descent.

Vietnam

Tran Anh Hung – French-trained expatriate director of Cyclo and other films.
Nguyen Vo Nghiem Minh – (Buffalo Boy)
Dang Nhat Minh – (Girl on the River, Guava Season)
Tony Bui – (Yellow Lotus, Green Dragon)
Ringo Le –  Vietnamese-American film director ("Saigon Love Story")
Dustin Nguyen – Vietnamese-American actor.
Johnny Tri Nguyen – Vietnamese-American stuntman and actor (Tom-Yum-Goong, Saigon Eclipse)
Veronica Ngô – Vietnamese-Norwegian actress and singer (Furie)
Hong Chau – Academy Award-nominated Vietnamese-American actress (The Whale)

See also
 Cinema of the world
 World cinema
 Asian cinema
 East Asian cinema
 South Asian cinema
 Middle Eastern cinema

Further reading
 Contemporary Asian Cinema, Anne Tereska Ciecko, editor. Berg, 2006. 
 Southeast Asian Independent Cinema'', Tilman Baumgärtel, editor. Hong Kong University Press, 2012.

References

External links
Criticine.com - Manila-based scholarly journal on Southeast Asian cinema.
Asian Film Archive - Singapore-based organization founded to preserve the film heritage of Singapore and Asian cinema.
EngageMedia - Social and environmental focused documentary film in Southeast Asia.

Cinema
Asian cinema
Asian cinema by region